A greenstick fracture is a fracture in a young, soft bone in which the bone bends and breaks. Greenstick fractures occur most often during infancy and childhood when bones are soft. The name is by analogy with green (i.e., fresh) wood which similarly breaks on the outside when bent.

Signs and symptoms
Some clinical features of a greenstick fracture are similar to those of a standard long bone fracture greenstick fractures normally cause pain at the injured area. As these fractures are specifically a pediatric problem, an older child will be protective of the fractured part and babies may cry inconsolably. As per a standard fracture, the area may be swollen and either red or bruised.  Greenstick fractures are stable fractures as a part of the bone remains intact and unbroken so this type of fracture normally causes a bend to the injured part, rather than a distinct deformity, which is problematic. Symptoms include pain in the area and can start from overuse in that specific bone. This can be a very gradual chronic pain or pain from a specific injury.

Risk factors
The greenstick fracture pattern occurs as a result of bending forces. Activities with a high risk of falling are risk factors. Non-accidental injury more commonly causes spiral (twisting) fractures but a blow on the forearm or shin could cause a greenstick fracture.  The fracture usually occurs in children and teens because their bones are flexible, unlike adults whose more brittle bones usually break.

Diagnosis
Projectional radiography is generally preferable.

Treatment
Removable splints result in better outcomes than casting in children with torus fractures of the distal radius. If a person is doing better after 4 weeks, repeat X rays are not needed.

Fossil record

Evidence for greenstick fractures found in the fossil record is studied by paleopathologists, specialists in ancient disease and injury. Greenstick fractures (willow breaks) have been reported in fossils of the large carnivorous dinosaur Allosaurus fragilis.

Greenstick fractures are found in the fossil remains of Lucy, the most famous specimen of Australopithecus afarensis, discovered in Ethiopia in 1974. Analysis of bone fracture patterns, which include a large number of greenstick fractures in the forearms, lower limbs, pelvis, thorax and skull, suggest that Lucy died from a vertical fall and impact with the ground.

References

External links

 Radiology Greenstick vs Torus Fractures

Bone fractures